Megalomphalus oxychone is a species of very small sea snail, a marine gastropod mollusk in the family Vanikoridae.

Distribution

Description 
The maximum recorded shell length is 4 mm.

Habitat 
Minimum recorded depth is 0 m. Maximum recorded depth is 60 m.

References

Vanikoridae
Gastropods described in 1877